Apple Inc. v. Samsung Electronic Co., Ltd. was the first of a series of ongoing lawsuits between Apple Inc. and Samsung Electronics regarding the design of smartphones and tablet computers; between them, the companies made more than half of smartphones sold worldwide as of July 2012. In the spring of 2011, Apple began litigating against Samsung in patent infringement suits, while Apple and Motorola Mobility were already engaged in a patent war on several fronts. Apple's multinational litigation over technology patents became known as part of the mobile device "smartphone patent wars": extensive litigation in fierce competition in the global market for consumer mobile communications. 
By August 2011, Apple and Samsung were litigating 19 ongoing cases in nine countries; by October, the legal disputes expanded to ten countries. By July 2012, the two companies were still embroiled in more than 50 lawsuits around the globe, with billions of dollars in damages claimed between them. While Apple won a ruling in its favor in the U.S., Samsung won rulings in South Korea, Japan, and the UK. On June 4, 2013, Samsung won a limited ban from the U.S. International Trade Commission on sales of certain Apple products after the commission found Apple had violated a Samsung patent, but this was vetoed by U.S. Trade Representative Michael Froman.

On December 6, 2016, the United States Supreme Court decided 8-0 to reverse the decision from the first trial that awarded nearly $400 million to Apple and returned the case to Federal Circuit court to define the appropriate legal standard "article of manufacture" because it is not the smartphone itself but could be just the case and screen to which the design patents relate.

Origin
On January 4, 2007, 4 days before the iPhone was introduced to the world, Apple filed a suit of 4 design patents covering the basic shape of the iPhone. These were followed up in June of that year with a massive filing of a color design patent covering 193 screenshots of various iPhone graphical user interfaces.  It is from these filings along with Apple's utility patents, registered trademarks and trade dress rights, that Apple selected the particular intellectual property to enforce against Samsung.  Apple sued its component supplier Samsung, alleging in a 38-page federal complaint on April 15, 2011 in the United States District Court for the Northern District of California that several of Samsung's Android phones and tablets, including the Nexus S, Epic 4G, Galaxy S 4G, and the Samsung Galaxy Tab, infringed on Apple's intellectual property: its patents, trademarks, user interface and style. Apple's complaint included specific federal claims for patent infringement, false designation of origin, unfair competition, and trademark infringement, as well as state-level claims for unfair competition, common law trademark infringement, and unjust enrichment.

Apple's evidence submitted to the court included side-by-side image comparisons of iPhone 3GS and i9000 Galaxy S to illustrate the alleged similarities in packaging and icons for apps. However, the images were later found to have been tampered with in order to make the dimensions and features of the two different products seem more similar, and counsel for Samsung accused Apple of submitting misleading evidence to the court.

Samsung counter-sued Apple on April 22, 2011, filing federal complaints in courts in Seoul, South Korea; Tokyo, Japan; and Mannheim, Germany, alleging Apple infringed Samsung's patents for mobile-communications technologies. By summer, Samsung also filed suits against Apple in the British High Court of Justice, in the United States District Court for the District of Delaware, and with the United States International Trade Commission (ITC) in Washington D.C., all in June 2011.

South Korean courts
In Seoul, Samsung filed its lawsuit in April 2011 in the Central District Court citing five patent infringements.
In late August 2012, a three-judge panel in Seoul Central District Court delivered a split decision, ruling that Apple had infringed upon two Samsung technology patents, while Samsung violated one of Apple's patents. The court awarded small damages to both companies and ordered a temporary sales halt of the infringing products in South Korea; however, none of the banned products were the latest models of either Samsung or Apple.

The court ruled that Samsung violated one of Apple's utility patents, over the so-called "bounce-back" effect in IOS and that Apple was in violation of two of Samsung's wireless patents. Apple's claims that Samsung copied the designs of the iPhone and iPad were deemed invalid. The court also ruled that there was "no possibility" that consumers would confuse the smartphones of the two brands, and that Samsung's smartphone icons did not infringe upon Apple's patents.

Japanese courts
Samsung's complaint in Japan's Tokyo District Court cited two infringements.  Apple has filed other patent suits in Japan against Samsung, most notably one for the "bounce-back" feature. Samsung has also sued Apple, claiming the iPhone and iPad infringe on Samsung patents.

On August 31, 2012, The Tokyo District Court ruled that Samsung's Galaxy smartphones and tablets did not violate an Apple patent on technology that synchronizes music and videos between devices and servers. The three-judge panel in Japan also awarded legal costs to be reimbursed to Samsung. Presiding Judge Tamotsu Shoji said: "The defendant's products do not seem like they used the same technology as the plaintiff's products so we turn down the complaints made by [Apple]."

German courts
In August 2011, the Landgericht court in Düsseldorf, Germany granted Apple's request for an EU-wide preliminary injunction barring Samsung from selling its Galaxy Tab 10.1 device on the grounds Samsung's product infringed on two of Apple's interface patents. After Samsung's allegations of evidence tampering were heard, the court rescinded the EU-wide injunction and granted Apple a lesser injunction that only applied to the German market. Samsung also pulled the Galaxy Tab 7.7 from Berlin's IFA electronics fair due to the ruling preventing marketing of the device, before the court was set to make its ruling in September 2011. According to an estimate by Strategy Analytics, the impact  on Samsung, in Germany, could have cost up to half a million unit sales. In the same time period and in similar cases of related legal strategy, Apple filed contemporaneous suits against Motorola with regard to the Xoom and against German consumer electronics reseller JAY-tech in the same German court, both for design infringement claims seeking preliminary injunctions.

On September 9, 2011, the German court ruled in favor of Apple, with a sales ban on the Galaxy Tab 10.1. The court found that Samsung had infringed Apple's patents. Presiding judge Johanna Brueckner-Hofmann said there was a "clear impression of similarity". Samsung would appeal the decision.

In March 2012, the Mannheim state court judges dismissed both the Apple and Samsung cases involving ownership of the "slide-to-unlock" feature used on their respective smartphones. The New York Times reported the German courts were at the center of patent fights among technology company rivals. In July 2012, the Munich Higher Regional Court Oberlandesgericht München affirmed the lower Regional Court's denial of Apple's motion for a preliminary injunction on Apple's allegation that Samsung infringed Apple's "overscroll bounce" patent; the appellate court's appealable ruling affirmed the lower court's February decision doubting the validity of Apple's patent. On September 21, the Mannheim Regional Court ruled in favour of Samsung in that it did not violate Apple's patented features in regards to touch-screen technology.

French and Italian courts
Shortly after the release of the iPhone 4S, Samsung filed motions for injunctions in courts in Paris and Milan to block further Apple iPhone sales in France and Italy, claiming the iPhone infringed on two separate patents of the Wideband Code Division Multiple Access standard. Samsung reportedly singled out the French and Italian markets as key electronic communications markets in Europe, and by filing suit in a different court, avoided going back to the German court where it had lost a round earlier in its battle with Apple.

Dutch courts
Apple initially sued Samsung on grounds of patent infringement, specifically European patents 2.059.868, 2.098.948, and 1.964.022. On the 24th of October, 2011, a court in the Hague ruled only a photo gallery app in Android 2.3 was indeed infringing a patent (EP 2.059.868), resulting in an import ban of three Samsung telephones (the Galaxy S, Galaxy S II, and Ace) running the infringing software. Phones operating more recent versions of Android remained unaffected. This made the import and sale of the banned phone models with updated software still legal. This ruling was widely interpreted as a favourable one for Samsung, and an appeal by Apple may still be forthcoming.

On September 26, 2011, Samsung counter-sued and asked the court for an injunction on sale Apple's iPad and iPhones, on the grounds that Apple does not have the licenses to use 3G mobile technology. On October 14, the court ruled, denying the sales ban and stating that because 3G was an industry standard, Samsung's licensing offer had to meet FRAND (fair, reasonable and nondiscriminatory) terms. The court found that Samsung's fee was unreasonable, but noted that, if the companies cannot make a fair and reasonable licensing fee, Samsung could open a new case against Apple.

In late October 2011, the civil court in The Hague ruled for Apple in rejecting Samsung's infringement arguments and denied Samsung's motion made there; Samsung appealed the decision and in January 2012, the Dutch appeals court overruled the civil court decision, rejecting Apple's claim that Samsung's Galaxy Tab 10.1 infringed its design rights.

Australian courts
Also in early 2011, an Australian federal court granted Apple's request for an injunction against Samsung's Galaxy Tab 10.1. Samsung agreed to an expedited appeal of the Australian decision in the hope that if it won its appeal before Christmas, it might salvage holiday sales that it would otherwise lose. Ultimately, the injunction Apple sought to block the Tab 10.1 was denied by the High Court of Australia. In July 2012 an Australian judge started hearing the companies' evidence for a trial anticipated to take three months.

British courts
Samsung applied to the High Court of Justice, Chancery Division, in Samsung Electronics (UK) Limited & Anr v. Apple Inc.,  for a declaration that its Galaxy tablets were not too similar to Apple's products. Apple counterclaimed, but Samsung prevailed after a British judge ruled Samsung's Galaxy tablets were not similar enough to be confused with Apple's iPad. In July 2012, Birss J denied Samsung's motion for an injunction blocking Apple from publicly stating that the Galaxy infringed Apple's design rights, but ordered Apple to publish a disclaimer on Apple's own website and in the media that Samsung did not copy the iPad. The judge stayed the publishing order, however, until Apple's appeal was heard in October 2012.  When the case reached the court of appeal, the previous ruling was supported, meaning that Apple is required to publish a disclaimer on Apple's own website and in the media that Samsung did not copy the iPad.

U.S. courts

First U.S. trial
In two separate lawsuits,  Apple accused Samsung of infringing on three utility patents (United States Patent Nos. 7,469,381, 7,844,915, and 7,864,163) and four design patents (United States Patent Nos. D504,889, D593,087, D618,677, and D604,305). Samsung accused Apple of infringing on United States Patent Nos. 7,675,941, 7,447,516, 7,698,711, 7,577,460, and 7,456,893. One 2005 design patent "at the heart of the dispute is Design Patent 504,889", which consists of a one-sentence claim about the ornamental design of an electronic device, accompanied by nine figures depicting a thin rectangular cuboid with rounded corners. A U.S. jury trial was scheduled for July 30, 2012 and calendared by the court through September 7, 2012. Both Phil Schiller and Scott Forstall testified on the Apple v. Samsung trial.

First trial verdict

On August 24, 2012 the jury returned a verdict largely favorable to Apple. It found that Samsung had willfully infringed on Apple's design and utility patents and had also diluted Apple's trade dresses related to the iPhone. The jury awarded Apple $1.049 billion in damages and Samsung zero damages in its counter suit. The jury found Samsung infringed Apple's patents on iPhone's "Bounce-Back Effect" (US Patent No. 7,469,381), "On-screen Navigation" (US Patent No. 7,844,915), and "Tap To Zoom" (US Patent No. 7,864,163), and design patents that covers iPhone's features such as the "home button, rounded corners and tapered edges" (US D593087) and "On-Screen Icons" (US D604305). Design Patent 504,889 (describing the ornamental design of the iPad) was one of the few patents the jury concluded Samsung had not infringed. This amount is functionally reduced by the bond posted by Apple for the injunction granted during the trial (see below).

On October 23, 2012, U.S. Patent and Trademark Office tentatively invalidated Apple's bounce back patent (US Patent No. '381) possibly affecting the ruling in the Apple v. Samsung trial. Apple's attorneys filed a request to stop all sales of the Samsung products cited in violation of the US patents, a motion denied by Judge Lucy H. Koh on December 17, 2012, who also decided that the jury had miscalculated US$400 million in its initial damage assessment and ordered a retrial.

Injunction of U.S. sales during first trial
The injunction Apple sought in the U.S. to block Samsung smartphones such as the Infuse 4G and the Droid Charge was denied. Judge Koh ruled that Apple's claims of irreparable harm had little merit because although Apple established a likelihood of success at trial on the merits of its claim that Samsung infringed one of its tablet patents, Apple had not shown that it could overcome Samsung's challenges to the patent's validity.

Apple appealed Judge Koh's ruling, and on May 14, 2012, the appeals court reversed and ordered Judge Koh to issue the injunction. The preliminary injunction was granted in June 2012, preventing Samsung from making, using, offering to sell, selling, or importing into the U.S. the Galaxy Nexus and any other of its technology making use of the disputed patent. Simultaneously, Apple was ordered to post a US$95.6 million bond in the event that Samsung prevailed at trial.

Following the trial, in which the Nexus was found not to infringe Apple's patents, Samsung filed an appeal to remove the preliminary injunction. On October 11, 2012, the appeals court agreed and vacated the injunction.

A new hearing was held in March 2014, in which Apple sought to prevent Samsung from selling some of its current devices in U.S. At the hearing, Judge Koh ruled against a permanent injunction.

First trial appeal
There was an interview given by the jury foreman, where, at the 3 minute mark in the video, the jury foreman Hogan said: "the software on the Apple side could not be placed into the processor on the prior art and vice versa, and that means they are not interchangeable," and at the 2:42-2:45 minute mark, in which Hogan states "each patent had a different legal premise." Groklaw reported that this interview indicates the jury may have awarded inconsistent damages and ignored the instructions given to them. In an article on Gigaom, Jeff John Roberts contended that the case suggests that juries should not be allowed to rule on patent cases at all. Scott McKeown, however, suggested that Hogan's comment may have been poorly phrased.

Some have claimed that there are a few oddities with Samsung's U.S. Patent discussed by Hogan during the interview, specifically that the '460 patent has only one claim. Most US patents have between 10 - 20 separate claims, most of which are dependent claims.  This patent was filed as a division of an earlier application, possibly in anticipation of litigation, which may explain the reduced number of claims.  The specifics of this patent have not been discussed in the Groklaw review or the McKeown review because most  believe that the foreman misspoke when he mentioned the number of the patent in question; a more detailed interview with the BBC made it clear that the patent(s) relevant to the prior art controversy were owned by Apple, not Samsung, meaning that his mention of the "460 patent" was a mistake.

On Friday, September 21, 2012, Samsung requested a new trial from the judge in San Jose arguing that the verdict was not supported by evidence or testimony, that the judge imposed limits on testimony time and the number of witnesses prevented Samsung from receiving a fair trial, and that the jury verdict was unreasonable. Apple filed papers on September 21 and 22, 2012 seeking a further amount of interest and damages totaling $707 million. A hearing has been scheduled in U.S. District Court on December 6, 2012 to discuss these and other issues.

On October 2, 2012, Samsung appealed the decision to the United States Court of Appeals for the Federal Circuit, requesting that Apple's victory be thrown out, claiming that the foreman of the jury had not disclosed that he had been sued by Seagate Technology Inc., his former employer, and which has a strategic relationship with Samsung, despite having been asked during jury selection if he had been involved in lawsuits. Samsung also claimed that the foreman had not revealed a past personal bankruptcy. The foreman responded that he had been asked during jury selection whether he had been involved in any lawsuits during the past 10 years, so that the events claimed by Samsung occurred before that time frame, although his claim is not consistent with the actual question he was asked by the Judge. Apple has similarly appealed the decision vacating the injunction on Samsung's sales.

Leading up to a December 4, 2014 hearing at the United States Court of Appeals for the Federal Circuit, Samsung had noted that the USPTO had released preliminary and/or final findings of invalidity against some of the patents relevant to the first case, namely the so-called pinch-to-zoom patent 7,844,915.  Samsung argued for, at the very least, a recalculation of the damages they owe in the case.  On May 18, 2015, the Federal Circuit affirmed parts of the jury verdict, but vacated the jury's damages awards against the Samsung products that were found liable for trade dress dilution.

First trial controversy
The ruling in the landmark patent case raised controversies over the impact on the consumers and the smartphone industry. The jury's decision was described as being 'Apple-friendly' by Wired and a possible reason for the increased costs—because of licensing fees to Apple—that subsequently affected Android smartphone users. A question was also raised about the validity of lay juries in the U.S. patent system, whereby the qualifications of the jury members were deemed inadequate for a complex patent case; however, it was later revealed that the jury foreman Velvin Hogan was an electrical engineer and a patent holder himself. Hogan's post-verdict interviews with numerous media outlets raised a great deal of controversy over his role as the jury foreman. He told Bloomberg TV that his experience with patents had helped to guide the jurors' decisions in the trial. A juror Manuel Ilagan said in an interview with CNET a day after the verdict that "Hogan was jury foreman. He had experience. He owned patents himself … so he took us through his experience. After that it was easier." As the jury instructions stated that jurors can make decisions based solely on the law as instructed and "not based on your understanding of the law based on your own cases," controversy was consequently generated.

Hogan also told the Reuters news agency that the jury wanted to make sure the message it sent was not just a "slap on the wrist" and wanted to make sure it was sufficiently high to be painful, but not unreasonable. His remark does not corroborate with jury instructions that state: "the damages award should put the patent holder in approximately the financial position it would have been in had the infringement not occurred" and "it is meant to compensate the patent holder and not to punish an infringer." Samsung appealed against the decision, claiming jury misconduct, and Samsung can be given a new trial if the appeal court finds that there was juror misconduct.

Other questions were raised about the jury's quick decision. The jury was given more than 700 questions, including highly technical matters, to reach the verdict and awarded Apple more than US$1 billion in damages after less than three days of deliberations. Critics claimed that the nine jurors did not have sufficient time to read the jury instructions. A juror stated in an interview with CNET that the jury decided after the first day of deliberations that Samsung was in the wrong.

First Retrial of damages amount from first U.S. trial
In a damage-only retrial court session on November 13, 2013, ordered in relation to the first U.S. trial by Judge Koh in December 2012, Samsung Electronics stated in a San Jose, U.S. courtroom that Apple's hometown jury found Samsung copied some elements of Apple's design. Samsung's attorney clarified the purpose of the damage-only retrial and stated, "This is a case not where we're disputing that the 13 phones contain some elements of Apple's property," but the company disputed the US$379.8 million amount that Apple claimed that it is owed in the wake of Samsung's—Samsung presented a figure of US$52 million.

On November 21, 2013 the jury awarded a new figure of US$290 million. The following devices were the concern of the retrial: Captivate, Continuum, Droid Charge, Epic 4G, Exhibit 4G, Galaxy Prevail, Galaxy Tab, Gem, Indulge, Infuse 4G, Nexus S 4G, Replenish, and Transform.

Supreme Court decision of First Trial
On December 6, 2016, the United States Supreme Court decided 8-0 to reverse the decision from the first trial that awarded nearly $400 million to Apple and returned the case to Federal Circuit court to define the appropriate legal standard to define "article of manufacture" because it is not the smartphone itself, but could be just the case and screen to which the design patents relate.

Second Retrial of damages amount from first U.S. trial
On Sunday, October 22, 2017 district court judge Lucy Koh ordered a second retrial of damages based upon the limitations imposed by the above decision of the United States Supreme Court. The parties were ordered to propose a schedule for a new trial by Wednesday, October 25.

The jury trial for damages concluded on May 24, 2018, awarding Apple $539 million, which includes $399 million for damages of Samsung's products sold that infringed on the patents.

Second U.S. trial
Apple filed a new U.S. lawsuit in February 2012, asserting Samsung's violation of five Apple patents across Samsung's product lines for its Admire, Galaxy Nexus, Galaxy Note, Galaxy Note II, Galaxy S II, Galaxy S II Epic 4G Touch, Galaxy S II Skyrocket, Galaxy S III, Galaxy Tab II 10.1, and Stratosphere. Samsung responded with a counterclaim, stating that two patents for nine phones and tablets have been infringed on by Apple across its iPhone 4, iPhone 4S, iPhone 5, iPad 2, iPad 3, iPad 4, iPad mini, iPod touch (5th generation), iPod touch (4th generation), and MacBook Pro lines. Samsung stood to gain US$6 million if the jury rules in its favor, while Apple was seeking US$2 billion in damages and could proceed with similar lawsuits against other Android handset makers, as the relevant patent issues extend beyond Samsung's software technology.

The second trial was scheduled for March 2014 and jury selection occurred on March 31, 2014. Judge Koh referred to the new lawsuit as "one action in a worldwide constellation of litigation between the two companies."

The trial began in early April and decision was delivered on May 2, 2014 and Samsung was instructed to pay US$119.6 million to Apple for smartphone patent violations, a compensatory amount that was termed a "big loss" by The Guardian'''s "Technology" team—the media outlet described the victory as "pyrrhic." The jury found that Samsung had infringed upon two Apple patents and Brian Love, assistant professor at the Santa Clara University law school, explained: "This amount is less than 10% of the amount Apple requested, and probably doesn't surpass by too much the amount Apple spent litigating this case." Apple's official response was a reaffirmation that "Samsung willfully stole" from the Cupertino, US-based corporation; however, Apple's lawyers claimed that a technical mistake has been made by the jury and Koh ordered the jurors to return on May 5, 2014 to resolve an issue that is potentially worth several hundred thousand dollars.

The jury also found Apple liable for infringing one of Samsung's patents and the South Korean corporation, which had initially sought US$6 million of damages, was awarded US$158,400. In the wake of the verdict, Judge Koh will be responsible for deciding whether a sales ban of Samsung products will be implemented, a decision that was deemed highly unlikely by legal experts, such as Rutgers Law School's Michael Carrier, after the verdict announcement.

Samsung appealed the jury verdict to a three-judge panel of the United States Court of Appeals for the Federal Circuit in 2015, and won in February 2016, with the panel nullifying the jury verdict. The panel unanimously argued that one patent cited by Apple was not infringed by Samsung, while two others, related to autocorrect and "slide to unlock" features, were invalid based on existing prior art. Apple requested an en banc hearing from the full Federal Circuit, which ruled in favor of Apple by an 8-3 decision, restoring the $120 million award, in October 2016. While the original three judges maintained their opinion from the previous hearing, the remaining judges argued that the three-member panel had dismissed the body of evidence from the jury trial supporting that Apple's patents were valid and Samsung was infringing upon them.

Samsung appealed to the Supreme Court, but the Court announced in November 2017 that it would not hear the appeal, leaving the Federal Circuit's ruling in Apple's favor in place.

As of mid 2018, the trials over the patent dispute have been resolved, resulting in Apple being awarded $539 million.

See also
 Apple Inc. litigation
 Motorola Mobility v. Apple Inc. Smartphone patent wars
 U.S. patent law
 Markman v. Westview Instruments, Inc.''

References

Further reading

Apple Inc. litigation
United States lawsuits
United States administrative case law
United States computer case law
United States contract case law
United States patent case law
United States District Court for the Northern District of California cases
Samsung Electronics
Smartphone patent wars
United States Supreme Court cases